WLOH (1320 AM) is a commercial radio station licensed to Lancaster, Ohio, southeast of Columbus.  Owned by the WLOH Radio Company, WLOH broadcasts a country music radio format.  It also serves as a local affiliate for the Cincinnati Bengals Radio Network and the Ohio State Sports Network.  

By day, WLOK transmits 500 watts, but to protect other stations on 1320 AM from interference, at night it reduces power to 16 watts.  It uses a non-directional antenna.  The transmitter is on Duffy Road in Berne Township.  WLOH simulcasts over three FM translators: W283BO 104.5 MHz in Lancaster, W275CT 102.9 MHz in Somerset and W257EQ 99.3 MHz in Logan; and is also available online.

History
Its original call sign was WHOK, which stood for its owner, the Hocking Valley Broadcasting Company. WHOK was a daytimer, broadcasting at 500 watts and required to go off the air at sunset. Dr. Nelson Embrey was the General Manager and the studios were on Memorial Drive.

In 1958, it added an FM station, WHOK-FM at 95.5 MHz.  (The FM station was later sold and is today Urban AC outlet WXMG.)  By the 1970s, WHOK was airing a full service, middle of the road format of popular adult music, news and sports, while the FM station had an authomated country music sound.  WHOK 1320 AM changed its call letters to WLOH in 1981, while the FM station kept the WHOK-FM call sign.

In 2001, WLOH was acquired by Frontier Broadcasting for $325,000.  The station changed to a country music format on January 30, 2015.

Translators

Former on-air staff

Stan Robinson was recipient of the Russell W. Alt Award for his 43+ years of promoting county fairs in Ohio.  Each year he'd broadcast from The Fairfield County Fair and he hosted The Stan Robinson @ RJ Pitcher Inn.

References

External links 

FM Translator

LOH